Love in a Hurry is a 1919 American silent spy drama film directed by Dell Henderson and starring Carlyle Blackwell, Evelyn Greeley and George MacQuarrie. It is set in England during World War I.

Cast
 Carlyle Blackwell as 	Charles Conant
 Evelyn Greeley as Lady Joan Templar
 Isabel O'Madigan as 	Lady Dartridge
 George MacQuarrie as 	George Templar
 William Bechtel as John Murr
 Kid Broad as 	Shorty
 Richard Collins as Captain 
 Louis R. Grisel as 	Gardener
 Charles Dewey	as Secret Service Man

References

Bibliography
 Connelly, Robert B. The Silents: Silent Feature Films, 1910-36, Volume 40, Issue 2. December Press, 1998.
 Munden, Kenneth White. The American Film Institute Catalog of Motion Pictures Produced in the United States, Part 1. University of California Press, 1997.

External links
 

1919 films
1919 drama films
1910s English-language films
American silent feature films
Silent American drama films
American black-and-white films
Films directed by Dell Henderson
World Film Company films
Films set in England
American World War I films
1910s American films